Il Passo delle Sensazioni (2005)  is a collection of poems written by Marco Di Meco.
The work consists of 12 short poems and is concerned with life experiences by the author during his life period in Switzerland.

References

Italian poetry collections